Gymnetis litigiosa is a  species of beetle in the family Scarabaeidae.

References

Cetoniinae